Oxyinae is subfamily of grasshoppers in the family Acrididae. Species are distributed throughout Africa (including Madagascar) and Australasia.

Tribes and Genera 
According to the Orthoptera Species File there are two clearly defined tribes, Oxyini and Praxibulini, and other genera of uncertain affiliation:

Oxyini
Auth. Brunner von Wattenwyl, 1893; selected genera:
Gesonula Uvarov, 1940
Lucretilis Stål, 1878
Oxya Serville, 1831
Oxyina Hollis, 1975
Pseudoxya Yin & Liu, 1987
Quilta Stål, 1861
Thanmoia Ramme, 1941

Praxibulini
Auth. Rehn, 1957 – Australia
Kosciuscola Sjöstedt, 1934
Methiola Sjöstedt, 1920
Methiolopsis Rehn, 1957
Praxibulus Bolívar, 1906

tribe not placed
As of 2021:

References 

Tijdschrift voor Entomologie 147, pages 289–320

 
Orthoptera subfamilies
Taxa named by Carl Brunner von Wattenwyl